The 1992–93 FIBA Korać Cup was the 22nd edition of FIBA's Korać Cup basketball competition. The Italian Philips Milano defeated the Italian Virtus Roma in the final. This was the second consecutive year in which the final two teams were both Italian and the third consecutive Italian victory. It was Philips Milano's second time winning the title following a victory in 1985 playing as Simac Milano.

First round

|}

*Spartak Pleven withdrew before the first leg and Urartu received a forfeit (2–0) in both games.

Second round

|}

*Budućnost, Užice, Vojvodina, and Radnički Belgrade were banned from competing due to international sanctions on FR Yugoslavia; their rivals received a forfeit (2–0) in both games.
*Çukurova Üniversitesi withdrew before the first leg and their rivals received a forfeit (2–0) in both games.

Third round

|}

Round of 16

Group A

Group B

Group C

Group D

Quarterfinals

|}

Semifinals

|}

Finals

|}

External links
 1992–93 FIBA Korać Cup @ linguasport.com

1992–93
1992–93 in European basketball